"Ice" is a song by the Finnish rock band The Rasmus (then named just "Rasmus"), originally included on the band's second album Playboys. The EP-single was also released in 1998 by the record label Warner Music Finland. It is the fourth single from the album Playboys, and features the B-side song, "Ufolaulu" (a song in Finnish about UFOs).

"Ice" is a typical song with a mix of rock, pop, funk and jazz.

Track listing
 "Ice" – 2:45
 "Ufolaulu" – 1:56
 "Well Well" (live) – 3:14
 "Kola" (live) – 3:43

Other appearances
"Ice" is also included as the ninth track on the band's compilation album Hell of a Collection, which was released in 2001.

Personnel
 Lauri Ylönen – vocals
 Pauli Rantasalmi – guitar
 Eero Heinonen – bass
 Janne Heiskanen – drums
 Riku Niemi – strings

The Rasmus songs
1999 singles
Warner Music Group singles
Songs written by Lauri Ylönen
1999 songs
Songs written by Pauli Rantasalmi